Adam Woronowicz (born 25 December 1973) is a Polish actor. He has appeared in more than 90 films since 1995. He received the Polish Academy Award for Best Supporting Actor for The Christening. Woronowicz played the role of Father Jerzy Popiełuszko in the film Popieluszko: Freedom Is Within Us directed by Rafał Wieczyński. Adam Woronowicz was awarded many times for his theatrical roles. He plays on stage in TR Warszawa.

Selected filmography
 1999: Skok as Kosa
 2002: Chopin: Desire for Love as Maurice Dudevant
 2009: Popieluszko: Freedom Is Within Us as Father Jerzy Popiełuszko
 2009: Generał Nil as Igor Andrejew
 2009: Reverse as Mr Józef
 2010: The Christening as Gruby
 2011: Man, Chicks Are Just Different as Adaś Miauczyński
 2012: Czas honoru as Col. UB Leon Wasilewski
 2013: Traffic Department as prosecutor Czech
 2013: Walesa: Man of Hope
 2014: The Mighty Angel
 2015: The Red Spider as vet Lucjan Staniak
 2015: Pakt as Dariusz Skalski, Minister of the Economy
 2015: Demon
 2017: Breaking the Limits
 2018: Cold War

External links 
 
 Adam Woronowicz's profile at filmpolski.pl
 Adam Woronowicz's profile at e-teatr.pl
 Adam Woronowicz at filmweb.pl

References 

1973 births
Living people
People from Białystok
Polish male film actors
Polish male stage actors
Polish male television actors
20th-century Polish male actors
21st-century Polish male actors